Supralathosea baboquivariensis is a species of mossy sallow in the family of moths known as Noctuidae. It was first described by William Barnes and Foster Hendrickson Benjamin in 1924 and it is found in North America.

The MONA or Hodges number for Supralathosea baboquivariensis is 10024.

References

Further reading

 
 
 

Amphipyrinae
Articles created by Qbugbot
Moths described in 1924